John Golding may refer to:

 John Golding (artist and writer) (1929–2012)
 John Golding (British politician) (1931–1999), British politician and activist
 John Anthony Golding (1920–2012), Administrator of the Turks and Caicos Islands
 Jon Golding (born 1982), British rugby player
 John Golding (died 1694), English pirate and privateer